Josh Stansbury (born November 19, 1984) is an American mixed martial artist. He was the light heavyweight North American Allied Fight Series (NAAFS) champions in 2013 and formally fought for Bellator. Stansbury competes in Light Heavyweight division of the Ultimate Fighting Championship (UFC).

Background
Stansbury was born in East Liverpool, Ohio, Ohio, United States. His mother's family owned a business that travels to put on carnivals in the summer where Stansbury spent most of his summers at the carnival selling soft drink and helped work the rides and games.

Stansbury started trained  wrestling when he was six years old and he placed 4th Division 1 in the Ohio State Wrestling Tournament in 2002. His hopes of wrestling in college was not able to be realized and went to work full-time when his girlfriend was pregnant and had a child not long after his high school graduation. However, he still went to do some open mat wrestling session during his spare time. One of the guy at the wrestling gym who was also a MMA fighter, Nick Spencer, invited him to do some MMA session with him and he was instantly hooked.  He started his first fight two months later at the age of 21 in 2005 and won his first fight, feeling a surge of emotion from cheering crowd, and never looked back.

As an amateur, he won and successfully defended the heavyweight title of Next Level Fighting four times. As a professional, he won NAAFS  and Fight to Win light heavyweight titles. Stansbury was a Bellator veteran and held notable victories over Dane Bonnigson, John Hawk, and Dan Spohn.

Mixed martial arts career

Early career
He started his amateur career in 2005 and made his debut on November 23 against Aaron Caw at NLF 2 and won his first win via KO on round one. He amassed a record of 9-2 prior moved to fight professionally. He fought most of his fights for North American Allied Fight Series  and Bellator prior signed by UFC with a record of 7–2.

The Ultimate Fighter

The Ultimate Fighter 19
Stansbury was one of the participants in The Ultimate Fighter 19, a UFC's reality TV series, where the show debuted on April 16, 2014. He fought Irishman Chris Fields in his fight to enter the TUF house. Stansbury dominated the most of the round one but injured his left knee when he went for a takedown at the end of the round one.  He lost the fight and failed to enter house as one of the contestants.

The Ultimate Fighter 23
After his knee injury rehabilitation, Stansbury tried out The Ultimate Fighter 23. This time he managed to advance into the house, where Stansbury defeated Trever Carlson via Americana on round one.

On elimination round, Stansbury faced Abdel Medjedoub for Team Joanna Jędrzejczyk. He defeated Medjedoub via majority decision after two round with the score board of (20-18, 19-19, 20-18). Stansbury advanced to semi-finals round facing Cory Hendricks. Hendricks withdrew from the fight due to neck injury even though he was cleared by the doctor to continue on in the competition and was advised that he had a pinched nerve. Hendricks was replaced by Khalil Rountree, who was given the second chance by UFC president Dana White. Rountree defeated Stansbury via TKO on round one and ended his advancement to the final of TUF 23.

Ultimate Fighting Championship
Stansbury made his promotional debut on July 8, 2016 at UFC: The Ultimate Fighter 23 Finale against Cory Hendricks. He picked up a win via majority decision with the score board f (29-27, 29–27, 28-28).

He was expected to face Jake Collier on December 3, 2016 at The Ultimate Fighter 24 Finale. However, Collier pulled out of the fight in late October citing injury and was replaced by Devin Clark. After the three rounds, the judges handed down the win to Clark via unanimous decision.

On June 25, 2017, Stansbury faced Jeremy Kimball at UFC Fight Night: Chiesa vs. Lee. He lost the fight via TKO on round one.

On October 25, 2018, it was reported that Stansbury was released from UFC.

Superior Challenger
Stanbury faced upcoming light-heavyweight Swedish prospect Karl Albrektsson at Superior Challenger 18 losing via knockout.

Championships and accomplishments

Mixed martial arts
North American Allied Fight Series
North American Allied Fight Series Light Heavyweight Champion (One time) vs. John Hawk
Fight to Win
 Fight to Win: Prize Fighting Championship Light Heavyweight Champion (One time) vs. Jeremy Osheim

Mixed martial arts record

|- 
|Loss
|align=center|8-5
|Karl Albrektsson
|KO (punches)
|Superior Challenge 18
|
|align=center|1
|align=center|4:56
|Stockholm, Sweden
|
|-
|Loss
|align=center|8–4
|Jeremy Kimball
|TKO (punches)
|UFC Fight Night: Chiesa vs. Lee
|
|align=center|1
|align=center|1:21
|Oklahoma City, Oklahoma, United States
| 
|-
|Loss
|align=center| 8–3
|Devin Clark
|Decision (unanimous)
|The Ultimate Fighter: Tournament of Champions Finale
|
|align=center| 3
|align=center| 5:00
|Las Vegas, Nevada, United States  
|
|-
| Win
| align=center| 8–2
| Cory Hendricks
| Decision (unanimous)
| UFC: The Ultimate Fighter 23 Finale
| 
| align=center| 3
| align=center| 5:00
| Las Vegas, Nevada, United States
|
|-
| Win
| align=center| 7–2
| Victor Jones
| Submission (rear-naked choke)
| GOTC MMA: Gladiators of the Cage 19
| 
| align=center| 1
| align=center| 4:06
| Cheswick, Pennsylvania, United States
|
|-
| Win
| align=center| 6–2
| Jeremy Osheim
| Submission (guillotine choke)
| Fight to Win: Prize Fighting Championship 7
| 
| align=center| 1
| align=center| 3:42
| Denver, Colorado, United States
|
|-
| Win
| align=center| 5–2
| John Hawk
| Decision (unanimous)
| NAAFS: Rock N Rumble 7
| 
| align=center| 5
| align=center| 5:00
| Denver, Colorado, United States
|
|-
| Win
| align=center| 4–2
| Dan Spohn
| Submission (guillotine choke)
| Bellator 71
| 
| align=center| 1
| align=center| 2:30
| Chester, West Virginia, United States
|
|-
| Win
| align=center| 3–2
| John Opfar
| Submission (guillotine choke)
| NAAFS: Caged Fury 16
| 
| align=center| 1
| align=center| 1:55
| Morgantown, West Virginia, United States
|
|-
| Win
| align=center| 2–2
| Christopher Thad Schlichter
| TKO (punches)
| NAAFS: Caged Vengeance 8
| 
| align=center| 1
| align=center| 2:22
| Columbus, Ohio, United States
|
|-
| Win
| align=center| 1–2
| Dane Bonnigson
| Submission (guillotine choke)
| NNAAFS: Fight Night in the Flats 6
| 
| align=center| 1
| align=center| 2:06
| Cleveland, Ohio, United States
|
|-
| Loss
| align=center| 0–2
| Dan Spohn
| Submission (guillotine choke)
| NAAFS: Caged Fury 8
| 
| align=center| 2
| align=center| 1:01
| East Liverpool, Ohio, United States
|
|-
| Loss
| align=center| 0–1
| John Hawk
| Submission (rear-naked choke)
| NAAFS: Fight Night in the Flats 5
| 
| align=center| 2
| align=center| 3:38
| Cleveland, Ohio, United States
|
|-

See also
 List of current UFC fighters
 List of male mixed martial artists

References

External links
 
 

1984 births
Living people
People from East Liverpool, Ohio
American male mixed martial artists
Light heavyweight mixed martial artists
Mixed martial artists utilizing collegiate wrestling
Mixed martial artists utilizing boxing
Mixed martial artists utilizing Brazilian jiu-jitsu
Ultimate Fighting Championship male fighters
American male sport wrestlers
Amateur wrestlers
American practitioners of Brazilian jiu-jitsu